Shorabak District (also Shorawak
) is a remote district situated in the southeastern part of Kandahar Province, Afghanistan, 110 km south and east of Kandahar. It borders Reg District to the west, Spin Boldak District to the north and Pakistan to the east and south. The population is 10,200 (2006).

The district is currently controlled by the Taliban, who took over the district on February 21, 2017.

References

External links

AIMS District Map

Districts of Kandahar Province